Ashton North End Football Club were an English football club from Ashton-under-Lyne at the end of the 19th century.

History
Ashton North End finished top of the Ashton & District League in 1891–92, and joined The Combination in 1894. They were Combination champions in their first season. In 1895 they joined the Lancashire League and played there for four seasons. The club went bankrupt in 1899 and resigned from the League.

Players
Famous players for Ashton North End include Herbert Chapman, who later led Huddersfield Town and Arsenal to the First Division title as manager, who played for Ashton between 1895 and 1896; and Arthur Wharton, Britain's first black professional footballer, who played for Ashton from 1897 until their demise in 1899.

See also
Ashton United, another club from Ashton, known as Hurst FC until 1946, that still exists today.

References

Defunct football clubs in England
Sport in Tameside
Association football clubs disestablished in 1899
1899 disestablishments in England
The Combination
Lancashire League (football)
Defunct football clubs in Lancashire
Defunct football clubs in Greater Manchester
Association football clubs established in the 1890s